The Order of Merit of the Federal Republic of Germany (or , BVO) is the only federal decoration of Germany. It is awarded for special achievements in political, economic, cultural, intellectual or honorary fields. It was created by the first President of the Federal Republic of Germany, Theodor Heuss, on 7 September 1951. Colloquially, the decorations of the different classes of the Order are also known as the Federal Cross of Merit.

It has been awarded to over 200,000 individuals in total, both Germans and foreigners. Since the 1990s, the number of annual awards has declined from over 4,000, first to around 2,300–2,500 per year, and now under 2,000, with a low of 1752 in 2011. Since 2013, women have made up a steady 30–35% of recipients.

Most of the German federal states (Länder) have each their own order of merit as well, with the exception of the Free and Hanseatic Cities of Bremen and Hamburg, which reject any orders (by tradition their citizens, particularly former or present senators, will refuse any decoration in the form of an order, the most famous example being former Chancellor Helmut Schmidt).

History
The order was established on 7 September 1951 by the decree of Federal President Theodor Heuss. Signed by Heuss, German Chancellor Konrad Adenauer, and Minister of the Interior Robert Lehr, the decree states:

In 2022 Federal President Frank-Walter Steinmeier introduced a gender quota which demands a minimum of 40% of nominees to the order to be women.

Classes
The Order comprises four groups with eight regular classes and one special (medal) class (hereafter enumerated in English):
 Grand Cross
 Grand Cross special class; the highest class of the Order reserved for heads of state.
 Grand Cross 1st class, special issue; equivalent to Grand Cross 1st class, but with laurel wreath design (awarded only twice in history, to Konrad Adenauer and Helmut Kohl)
 Grand Cross 1st class; Grand Cross
 Great Cross of Merit
 Grand Cross; Great Cross with Star and Sash
 Knight Commander's Cross; Great Cross with Star
 Commander's Cross; Great Cross of Merit 
 Cross of Merit
 Officer's Cross; Cross of Merit 1st Class
 Cross; Member
 Medal of Merit
 Medal

The President of the Federal Republic holds the Grand Cross special class ex officio. It is awarded to him in a ceremony by the President of the Bundestag, attended by the Chancellor of Germany, the President of the Bundesrat, and the Supreme Court President. Other than the German president, only a foreign head of state and their spouse can be awarded with this highest class. There is also the provision of awarding the Grand Cross 1st class in a "special issue" with laurel wreath design, in which the central medallion with the black eagle is surrounded by a stylized laurel wreath in relief. This Grand Cross 1st class, special issue has been awarded so far only twice, to former German chancellors Konrad Adenauer and Helmut Kohl.

Insignia

Except for the lowest class, the medal, the badge is the same for all classes, but with slightly different versions for men and women (slightly smaller badge and ribbon for women):

The badge for the Member and Officer classes however are only enamelled on one side, and flat on the reverse. The badge of the Order is made up of a golden four-armed cross enamelled in red, with a central gold disc bearing a black enamelled German federal eagle (Bundesadler).

The star is a golden star with straight rays, its size and points vary according to class, with the badge superimposed upon it. An interesting fact about the stars, of which no less than four grades use one, is that they all have the same basic shape as various other breast stars from German history. 

 8-pointed golden Star: Grand Cross special class - the same shape as the Prussian Order of the Black Eagle
 6-pointed golden Star: Grand Cross 1st class (and special issue design if golden oak crown between the cross branches around the medallion) - the same shape as the Third Reich Order of the German Eagle
 4-pointed golden Star: Grand Cross (Grand Cross of Merit with Star and Sash) - the same shape as the Third Reich Social Welfare Decoration
 silver Square-upon-point: Knight Commander (Grand Officer) - the same shape as the Grand Cross of the Pour le Mérite

The reasoning behind this is not clear. It is not known if this is deliberate or coincidence, as the tools used to make the stars were in short supply after the war, and using stamping dies that were readily available and could be reused or acquired from other manufacturers would have been a good way of cutting costs and simplifying production in a Germany only just starting to experience the Wirtschaftswunder.  It is of course possible that this could have been deliberate, and a way to celebrate German history in the design of the new honour for the Federal Republic. This is unlikely however as two stars represent decorations awarded during the Third Reich, and the other two are of Prussian origin. Prussia itself had only been recently abolished and the legacy of so called "Prussian militarism" was not something openly celebrated in the new Federal Republic of Germany. 

The riband of the Order is made up of the colours of the German flag. The pattern is a large central band of red, edged on both sides in a smaller band of gold-black-gold.

Gallery

Recipients

See also
Iron Cross
Order of Karl Marx
Pour le Mérite
Knight's Cross of the Iron Cross
Awards and decorations of the German Armed Forces

References

External links

Classes of the Order of Merit of the Federal Republic of Germany with their official French, English, Spanish and Russian translations (PDF)
 Order of Merit of the Federal Republic of Germany brochure 
 Stiftung Haus der Geschichte der Bundesrepublik Deutschland 

1951 establishments in West Germany
Awards established in 1951
Civil awards and decorations of Germany
Orders, decorations, and medals of Germany
Merit Of The Federal Republic Of Germany, Order of
Orders of merit